Lago d'Alzasca is a lake in the canton of Ticino, Switzerland.

See also
List of mountain lakes of Switzerland

Alzasca